CPNI may refer to:
 Centre for the Protection of National Infrastructure
 Communist Party of Northern Ireland
 Customer proprietary network information